Mecyna subsequalis is a species of moth in the family Crambidae. It is found in Bulgaria, Greece, Russia and Syria.

References

Moths described in 1851
Spilomelinae
Moths of Europe